Ge Schous is a retired Dutch lightweight rower who won a bronze medal in the lightweight coxless four at the 1977 World Rowing Championships.

References

External links

Living people
Dutch male rowers
World Rowing Championships medalists for the Netherlands
Year of birth missing (living people)